Sukkur is a city in Sindh, Pakistan.

Sukkur may also refer to:

Places 
Sukkur Taluka, a tehsil of Sukkur district
Sukkur District, a district of Sindh, Pakistan
Sukkur Division, an administrative unit of Sindh, Pakistan
Sukkur Barrage, a barrage in Pakistan

Transportation
Sukkur Express, a train of Pakistan railways
Sukkur railway station, a railway station in Pakistan
Sukkur rail disaster, an accident which occurred in 1990 near Sukkur, Sindh
Sukkur Airport, an airport in Sindh, Pakistan

Other uses
Sukkur IBA University, a university in Sindh, Pakistan
Sukkur cricket team, a local domestic cricket team

See also